The 1999 Frankfurt Galaxy season was the seventh season for the franchise in the NFL Europe League (NFLEL). The team was led by head coach Dick Curl in his second year, and played its home games at Waldstadion in Frankfurt, Germany. They finished the regular season in second place with a record of six wins and four losses. In World Bowl '99, Frankfurt defeated the Barcelona Dragons 38–24. The victory marked the franchise's second World Bowl championship.

Personnel

Staff

Roster

Schedule

Standings

Game summaries

Week 2: at Amsterdam Admirals

Week 8: vs Amsterdam Admirals

Notes

References

Frankfurt Galaxy seasons